Witold Wieliński (born 26 June 1968) is a Polish actor. In 1991 he finished his studies in Warszawa.

Selected filmography
 1992 - A Bachelor's Life Abroad as Wacek
 2004 - The Wedding as Gruby
 2008 - Four Nights with Anna
 2008 - Louise's Garden
 2009 - Pierwsza miłość as Sylwester Banaszkiewicz "Medyk"
 2013 - Life Feels Good
 2018 - Birds Are Singing in Kigali

External links
 
 http://www.filmweb.pl/person/Witold+Wieli%C5%84ski-48185
 http://www.filmpolski.pl/fp/index.php/1115417
 Witold Wieliński at e-teatr.pl

1968 births
Living people
Polish male actors